Nimbus B was a meteorological satellite launched as part of the Nimbus program. It was released on May 18, 1968 from the Vandenberg Air Force Base, Lompoc, California, by means of a Thor-Agena launch vehicle, together with the SECOR 10 satellite. Nimbus B never achieved orbit because of a malfunction in the booster guidance system forced the destruction of the spacecraft and its payload during launch.

The Radioisotope Thermoelectric Generator SNAP-19 RTG was salvaged from the water, refurbished and later flown on Nimbus 3.

Instruments 
 High Data Rate Storage System (DHRSS)
 High and Medium-Resolution Infrared Radiometers (HRIR/MRIR)
 Image Dissector Camera System (IDCS) 
 Infrared Interferometer Spectrometer (IRIS)
 Monitor of Ultraviolet Solar Energy (MUSE) 
 Radioisotope Thermoelectric Generator (SNAP-19) 
 Real-time transmission System (RTTS)
 Satellite Infrared Spectrometer (SIRS)

See also 

 Television Infrared Observation Satellite

References

1968 in spaceflight
Weather satellites of the United States
Satellite launch failures